The International Journal of Nursing Knowledge is a peer-reviewed nursing journal for standardized nursing languages and their applications. It is the official publication of NANDA.

Abstracting and indexing 
The journal is abstracted and indexed by Academic Search Premier, CINAHL, Index Medicus/MEDLINE, PubMed, ProQuest, and Scopus.

References

External links 
 

General nursing journals
English-language journals
Wiley-Blackwell academic journals
Quarterly journals
Publications established in 1990